The Smith Point Formation is an Early Cambrian (c. Tommotian), fossil-rich, pink to brick red limestone formation  cropping out in Newfoundland.

Palaeontology 
Its fossil assemblage includes trilobites, hyoliths, and microbialites (stromatolites/ oncolites).

References

Stratigraphy of Canada
Cambrian Newfoundland and Labrador